Sir Marcus John Cheke  (20 October 1906 – 22 June 1960) was a British diplomat and courtier.

Career

Marcus Cheke was educated at Clayesmore School and  Trinity College, Oxford. In the British general election of 1929 he stood as Liberal candidate for the New Forest and Christchurch constituency but was defeated by the sitting MP, Wilfrid Ashley.

Cheke was Honorary Attaché at the British Embassy, Lisbon, 1931–34 and at Brussels 1934–37; Press Attaché, Lisbon, 1938–42; attached to the staff of the Lisbon Embassy with the local rank of First Secretary 1942–45; and Vice-Marshal of the Diplomatic Corps 1946–57. He was appointed Minister to the Holy See in 1957 and died in office in Rome in 1960. He was also an Extra Gentleman Usher to the Queen from 1957.

Cheke was appointed CVO in 1952, CMG in 1955 and knighted KCVO in 1957.

Personal

In 1939 Marcus Cheke married the Honourable Constance Elizabeth Lopes, daughter of the 1st Baron Roborough. They had no children.

In 1945, when leaving Lisbon, Cheke donated a painting to the Câmara Municipal (city council), by him, depicting the Terreiro do Paço.

Publications

 Papillée, Faber & Gwyer, London, 1927
 The licking [Reminiscences of the author's childhood], Grayhound Press, Winchester, 1931
 Hide and Seek, Collins, London, 1934
 A tale of Lisbon [A poem], The Shakespeare Head Press, Oxford, 1937
 Dictator of Portugal: A Life of the Marquis of Pombal, 1699–1782, Sidgwick & Jackson, London, 1938
 Acta n.º 99, Câmara Municipal de Lisboa, 1945
 Carlota Joaquina, Queen of Portugal, Sidgwick & Jackson, London, 1947
 Guidance on Foreign Usages and Ceremony, and Other Matters, for a Member of His Majesty's Foreign Service on His First Appointment to a Post Abroad, HM Diplomatic Corps, London, 1949
 The Cardinal de Bernis, Cassell, London, 1958

References
CHEKE, Sir Marcus (John), Who Was Who, A & C Black, 1920–2008; online edn, Oxford University Press, Dec 2007, accessed 19 Feb 2012
The Pope calls on Sir Marcus, The Catholic Herald, 3 June 1960
Copac - Brief Record Display - Marcus Cheke

1906 births
1960 deaths
Alumni of Trinity College, Oxford
Knights Commander of the Royal Victorian Order
Companions of the Order of St Michael and St George
Ambassadors of the United Kingdom to the Holy See
People educated at Clayesmore School